The 2021 NÖ Open was a professional tennis tournament played on clay courts. It was the first edition of the tournament which was part of the 2021 ATP Challenger Tour. It took place in Tulln an der Donau, Austria between 6 and 12 September 2021.

Singles main-draw entrants

Seeds

 1 Rankings are as of 30 August 2021.

Other entrants
The following players received wildcards into the singles main draw:
  Gerald Melzer
  Filip Misolic
  Lukas Neumayer

The following players received entry into the singles main draw as alternates:
  Johannes Härteis
  Lucas Miedler

The following players received entry from the qualifying draw:
  Benjamin Hassan
  Uladzimir Ignatik
  Matteo Martineau
  Neil Oberleitner

Champions

Singles

  Mats Moraing def.  Hugo Gaston 6–2, 6–1.

Doubles

  Dustin Brown /  Andrea Vavassori def.  Rafael Matos /  Felipe Meligeni Alves 7–6(7–5), 6–1.

References

NÖ Open
2021 in Austrian sport
September 2021 sports events in Europe